Mighiana is a tribe and a sub-caste of Sial (a Jat tribe), mostly residents of area of Jhang in the province of Punjab, Pakistan. Mighiana also spelled as Maghiana is a twin city located next to Jhang. Both cities combined are called Jhang-Maghiana area.

Famous personalities 
Famous personalities in Mighiana family are:
Mehr Umar Hayat Mighiana Sial, former MPA, Member of Majlis-e-Shoora of Zia-ul-Haq Era, Landlord and Industrialist.
Mehr Zulfiqar Sial Mighiana, Landlord.
Mehr Nusrat Sial Mighiana S/o Mehr Sher, Landlord and former Chairman District Jhang.
Mohsin Mighiana,(ڈاکٹر محسن مگھیانہ) is a physician, surgeon, famous writer, columnist and humorist.
Mehr Muhammad Nawaz Mighiana (Advocate, Barrister) from Nawaz Abad

Mehr Sher Mighiana, Chairman of Jhang Mighiana.
Nawab Nusrat Ali Khan Mighiana,  Great LandLord of Jhang Mighiana, Chairman BAGH. s/o Mehr Sher Mighiana.
Nawab Nasir Abbas khan meghyana, Great Land Lord, Twice Chairman TMA BAGH. s/o Nawab Nusrat Ali Khan.
Mehr Peer Baksh, a landlord in Jhang Mighiana or (Jhang Maghiana) area
Mehr Kashwat Hussain Mighiana s/o Mehr Peer Baksh
Mehr Amar Abbas (Engineer) s/o Mehr Kashwat Hussain Mighiana
Nayyer Khan Sial (MSc Agri) s/o Khan Muhammad Mighiana Executive in Livestock department.
Mehr Nusrat Mighiana  from Khokhra Chak.
Mehr Arif  s/o Mehr Nusrat Mighiana from Khokhra Chak.
Mehr Sajjad Arif s/o Mehr Arif Mighiana from Khokhra Chak.
Mughees Khan Mighiana, a political activist & educater.
Mehr Noor Ahmad Mighiana Nambar Dar of chak kacha Mighiana he is great landlord Distts. Jhang
Muhammad Ali Mighiana  S/O Mehdi hayat Mighiana from Moaza Mighiana
Mehr Barkat Ali Barkat sial Mighiana Press Information Department

 Mehr Ghulam shabbir s/o mher flak sher mighiana reeas of jhang

Mehr Rauf Asad Mighiana (Chemical Engineer) S/O Mehr Allah Ditta Mighiana (Late)

See also 
 Sial
 Tribes of the Bar Region of the Punjab
 List of people from Jhang
 Jhang
mehr asad ali sahil maghyana lanlord of khokhra chak

References

Punjabi tribes